Paolo Curcetti (8 July 1936 – 17 April 2020) was an Italian boxer. As an amateur he won the Italian flyweight title in 1957, 1959 and 1960 and competed in the 1960 Summer Olympics, where he was eliminated in the third bout. Between 1961 and 1964 he fought professionally in the bantamweight division, and had a record of 12 wins (5 by knockout), 3 losses and one draw. His younger brother Gaetano was also an Olympic boxer.

1960 Olympic results
Below is the record of Paolo Curcetti, an Italian flyweight boxer who competed at the 1960 Rome Olympics:

 Round of 64: defeated Frank Kisekka (Uganda) by decision, 5-0
 Round of 32: defeated Jo Horny (Belgium) by decision, 5-0
 Round of 16: lost to Abdel Moneim El-Gindy (Egypt) by decision, 1-4

References

External links

 

1936 births
2020 deaths
Sportspeople from Foggia
Boxers at the 1960 Summer Olympics
Olympic boxers of Italy
Italian male boxers
Bantamweight boxers
20th-century Italian people